Tubbs Island is an island in San Pablo Bay (an embayment of San Francisco Bay). It is in Sonoma County, California, and parts of it are managed as part of the Napa-Sonoma Marshes Wildlife Area. It, long with Island No. 1, Island No. 2 and Green Island, are labeled on a 1902 USGS map of the area.

References

Islands of Sonoma County, California
Islands of Northern California
San Pablo Bay